The murder of Bonnie Garland took place on July 7, 1977, in Scarsdale, New York.

Details of the crime
In the early-morning hours of July 7, 1977, around 2 a.m. Yale graduate Richard Herrin bludgeoned his ex-girlfriend, Yale college senior Bonnie Garland, to death with a hammer as she lay sleeping in her parents' Scarsdale, New York, home because she wanted to end their relationship. The two college students had been dating for approximately two years at the time that Herrin graduated and moved to Texas to attend a graduate program. Over the next year Garland and Herrin grew apart. Garland wanted to date other people. Concerned about it, Herrin arranged, with Garland's knowledge, to come to Scarsdale to discuss their relationship. Her parents, not knowing there was trouble in the relationship, allowed him to stay at their home. Garland told Herrin on July 6, 1977, she wanted to break off their relationship. He was to leave the next day. He was staying in a guest room on the opposite end of the home. During the early morning hours of July 7, 1977, Herrin went down to the basement and found a hammer. He wrapped it in a towel to conceal it. He then went up three flights of stairs to Garland's room. As stated in the testimony, he left the hammer outside the door and went in to confirm she was asleep. He then went back out into the hallway, unwrapped the hammer, went back into the room and, using the claw end of the hammer, smashed her skull to pieces.

After attacking Garland, Herrin stole the Garland family car and drove around for hours ending up in Coxsackie, 100 miles to the north of Scarsdale. He found a church and told the priest inside, "I just killed my girlfriend."

In fact, Bonnie was still alive though fatally injured.  The priest called the Scarsdale police, who knocked on the Garlands' door early in the morning. They entered her bedroom to find her gurgling and horribly injured; she later died.

Judicial proceedings
Herrin was arrested. A group led by members of the clergy of Yale's Catholic Church campaigned to have Herrin released on bail. They raised bail money and wrote letters attesting to Herrin's "good character" to the trial judge. Impressed by the campaign, the judge released Herrin into the care of the Christian Brothers in Albany. While he was awaiting trial, he attended classes at the State University of New York under an alias. 

Judge Richard J. Daronco presided over the highly publicized trial at the Westchester County Courthouse in White Plains. Richard Herrin was convicted of first-degree manslaughter, rather than second degree murder and was sentenced to the maximum penalty under the law. He served 17 years in state prison at the Wende Correctional Facility in Alden, New York, and was released on January 12, 1995. Critics charged that the sentence was the result of the Yale community and, in particular, the Catholic chaplaincy uniting to support Herrin by portraying him as the victim of his upbringing in a minority neighborhood barrio in Los Angeles.  The Garland case foreshadowed others in which the circumstances of the killing were muddied by the personalities of the victim and accused, such as the Preppie Murder case, in which Jack Litman, Herrin's lawyer, represented the defendant.

Aftermath
After his release, Herrin moved to Socorro, New Mexico, where he was hired by a mental health foundation.

This was the last murder case in Scarsdale until the murder of 58-year-old pediatric doctor Robin Goldman on January 20, 2016.

References

The Yale Murder: The Compelling True Narrative of the Fatal Romance of Bonnie Garland and Richard Herrin, Peter Meyer
The Killing of Bonnie Garland: A Question of Justice, Willard Gaylin
True Stories of Law & Order by Kevin Dwyer and Juré Fiorillo

External links
A review of The Yale Murder

American murder victims
People murdered in New York (state)
1977 murders in the United States
1977 in New York (state)
Deaths by beating in the United States
July 1977 events in the United States
July 1977 crimes
Murdered American students
Violence against women in the United States
History of women in New York (state)
Scarsdale, New York
1970s crimes in New York (state)
Female murder victims
Hammer assaults